Newport-on-Tay is a small town in the north-east of Fife in Scotland, acting as a commuter town for Dundee. The Fife Coastal Path passes through Newport-on-Tay. The area itself is surrounded by views of the two bridges that cross the River Tay and distant views of the Scottish Highlands.

History

The town was established near the endpoint of one part of a ferry route that itself was started in the 12th century.

In 1715 a new pier and inn were built, the work being funded by the Guilds of Dundee which resulted in the settlement being called "New Dundee". Thomas Telford built a new harbour in the 1820s, and the town expanded and grew into a commuter suburb of Dundee as the prosperous jute manufacturers, industrialists and the middle and upper working class of Dundee established fashionable residences in Newport.

The local war memorial dates from 1920 and was designed by Sir Robert Lorimer.

Newport-on-Tay formerly had two railway stations – the East and West stations on what was the Newport Railway. Both stations (and the Tayport-Dundee branch line) closed in 1969, having lost much of their business following the opening of the Tay Road Bridge in 1966.  In fact, trains had ceased to run beyond Newport-on-Tay East station to Tayport on 22 May 1966 so that the railway line could be breached to build the bridge's southern approach road. The Dundee – Newport ferry also closed promptly later in 1966 on the opening of the Tay Road Bridge.  However, the ferry terminal buildings and slipways still survive at the foot of Boat Hill as a boat repair yard.

Archaeology

An excavation carried out by Headland Archaeology in the farm of North Straiton near Newport-on-Tay uncovered part of a Bronze Age cremation cemetery and a line of postholes. Five human cremations were found in a group of scattered disposal pits.  Around 25m away was a line of postholes, one of which was also associated with cremated human bone. Radiocarbon dates from the features indicated that they had been created in the Bronze Age, from around 1700 to 2000 BC.

The line of posts was substantial and may have been associated with the cremations rather than a building or fence. It is possible that the posts may have been memorials or markers close to the pyre used to burn the dead. Part of a quern stone and some burnt animal bone suggested that the cremation ceremony also involved preparing food. A collection of pottery was found with the cremations. This included a complete accessory vessel and fragments from a larger decorated pot that covered it.

Present
Newport currently has a population of about eight thousand, mostly residing in stone houses built before World War II. The town centre comprises two main streets where may be found a small variety of shops and three public houses. The town has one primary school, Newport Primary School. It was built in 1977 by the then Fife Regional Council Architectural Department, with Donald George Beaton working as the school's architect. Older pupils attend secondary school at Madras College in St Andrews, or at Bell Baxter High School in Cupar, or at the nearest independent schools, the High School of Dundee and St Leonards School.

Public bus routes are the 77 to Dundee, 92 to St Andrews, and the X54 to Edinburgh via Glenrothes (and Ninewells Hospital in the other direction)

Newport has been twinned with Zolotarevo, Ukraine since 20 July 2002.

Local amenities

Amenities on and around the High Street include food and drink stores, health and beauty outlets, trades and services, a variety of shops, an art gallery and a sports centre.

There are three churches:
Church of Scotland
Episcopal Church of Scotland (St Mary's)
Roman Catholic (St. Fillans)

A second Church of Scotland church, St. Fillans, originally a Free Church, was demolished in 1981.

Newport-on-Tay and the arts
The arts have played a major role in the shaping of Newport and its neighbourhood. In 1905 the Tayport Artists' Circle was formed, including James Douglas, Anna Douglas, Alec Grieve, Stewart Carmichael, William Bradley Lamond, Charles Adamson and the so-called "Painter's painter" David Foggie. Led by Frank Laing, their aim was to have an influence through art on the industrial environment; this is explained in a letter from Laing to the town planner/architect Patrick Geddes.

Many teachers of fine art in the University of Dundee's Duncan of Jordanstone College of Art and Design have migrated towards Newport-on-Tay and its north-west facing position for the incredible quality of light. Such heavy-weights in the Scottish art scene as John Byrne, Will Maclean and Marian Leven are associated with the area. A local community arts centre, The Forgan Arts, provides courses in arts and crafts. The Tatha art gallery opened in Newport-on-Tay in 2014.

Notable people
Sir John Leng (1828-1906), politician and publisher
John Leng Sturrock (1878-1943), politician
George Ranken Tudhope FRSE (1893-1955) pathologist
Sir Charles Lambe (1900-1960), First Sea Lord, Admiral of the Fleet; born in Dorset, residence Newport, died Newport 1960
Scott Sutherland (1910-1984), DA, RSA, FRBS, sculptor
Valentine Fleming (1882-1917), Conservative politician

Notes

References

External links
 Newport-on-Tay Church of Scotland
 Newport-on-Tay Smart Community
 Newport-on-Tay on Fife Direct
 Gazetteer for Scotland: Newport-on-Tay
 Nevermore TravelBlog: Newport
 Visit Newport-on-Tay, Newport-on-Tay Traders Association
 BBC Stark Talk with Will Maclean and Marian Leven
 Newport-on-Tay History Group Website and Archive

 
Towns in Fife
Burghs
Bronze Age sites in Scotland
Populated coastal places in Scotland